The Combat of the Apa River was a military confrontation on May 12 1867 between Brazilian and Paraguayan forces on a farm near the José Carlos stream, on the right bank of the Apa River, in the province of Mato Grosso do Sul, on the border between the belligerents.

During the Paraguayan occupation of the province, the invaders had dominated a farm in the region, later renamed Fazenda Marechal López, where the ultimate combat took place. There, Paraguayans began to develop gardens and raise cattle. The Brazilian forces of the 17th Battalion of Volunteers of the Fatherland, who would later be part of the campaign called Withdrawal from the Lagoon, approached the farm and started the confrontation, on May 12, 1867. The Paraguayans tried to disable the farm, setting the fields on fire, harassing the cattle, then fleeing.

References

Apa River
Apa River
Apa River
Apa River
May 1867 events
History of Mato Grosso do Sul